K-1 PREMIUM 2003 Dynamite!! was an annual kickboxing and mixed martial arts event held by K-1 on New Year's Eve, Wednesday, December 31, 2003 at the Nagoya Dome in Nagoya, Japan. It featured 6 K-1 MMA rules fights, and 4 K-1 rules fights.

The event attracted a sellout crowd of 43,560 to the Nagoya Dome, and was broadcast across Japan on the TBS Network.

Results

Opening Fight, K-1 MMA Rules:
  Kristof Midoux vs.  Tom Howard
Midoux defeated Howard by Submission (Rear Naked Choke) at 4:21 of the 1st round.

Fight #1, K-1 MMA Rules:
  Genki Sudo vs.  Butterbean
Sudo defeated Butterbean by Submission (Heel Hook) at 0:41 of the 2nd round.

Fight #2, K-1 MMA Rules:
  Jan Nortje vs.  Masayuki Naruse
Naruse defeated Nortje by Submission (Rear Naked Choke) at 4:40 of the 1st round.

Fight #3, K-1 MMA Rules:
  Mauricio da Silva vs.  The Predator
Predator defeated Silva by TKO (Punches) at 0:13 of the 1st round.

Fight #4, K-1 Rules:
  Francois Botha vs.  Yusuke Fujimoto
Fujimoto defeated Botha by Unanimous Decision (3-0).

Fight #5, K-1 Rules:
  Francisco Filho vs.  Toa
Filho defeated Toa by Unanimous Decision (3-0).

Fight #6, K-1 Rules:
  Ernesto Hoost vs.  Montanha Silva
Hoost defeated Silva by Unanimous Decision (3-0).

Fight #7, K-1 MMA Rules:
  David Khakhaleishvili vs.  Yoshihiro Nakao
Nakao defeated Khakhaleishivili by Submission (Punches) at 1:13 of the 2nd round.

Fight #8, K-1 MMA Rules:
  Alexey Ignashov vs.  Shinsuke Nakamura
Ignashov defeated Nakamura by TKO (Knee) at 1:19 of the 3rd round.

Main Event, K-1 Rules:
  Bob Sapp vs.  Akebono
Sapp defeated Akebono by TKO at 2:58 of the 1st round.

See also
 List of K-1 events
 List of male kickboxers
 PRIDE Shockwave 2003
 INOKI BOM-BA-YE 2003

References

External links
K-1 Official Website

K-1 events
2003 in kickboxing
2003 in mixed martial arts
Mixed martial arts in Japan
Kickboxing in Japan
Sport in Nagoya